Ancient Romans is the fifth solo studio album by Cameron Stallones as Sun Araw. It was released on Sun Ark Records and Drag City on August 23, 2011.

Critical reception

At Metacritic, which assigns a weighted average score out of 100 to reviews from mainstream critics, the album received an average score of 75, based on 16 reviews, indicating "generally favorable reviews".

Paul Thompson of Pitchfork described the album as "another fever dream of dub-mottled organ grind and guitar squiggle, at once elemental and futuristic." Ned Raggett of AllMusic wrote, "Throughout the album the sense is of rough experimentation, a kind of direct curiosity in the collision of sampled loops, echoed vocals, bursting bass, and random moments." Adam Kivel of Consequence of Sound commented that "You can't help but move along to some of the entrancing, pulsing drones found on Ancient Romans; altogether, another epic, grandiose, striking LP from one of the best and most underrated musicians of the moment."

The Wire placed the album at number 12 on the "Top 50 Releases of the Year" list.

Track listing

Personnel
Credits adapted from liner notes.

 Cameron Stallones – performance, engineering, mixing
 Bobb Bruno – engineering
 Matthew Koshak – mixing
 Sonic Boom – mastering

References

External links
 

2011 albums